Lewiston Hill (also known as the "Clearwater Escarpment") is a large sloping escarpment in the northwest  United States, located immediately north of the confluence of the Clearwater and Snake rivers in north central Idaho.

Residents of the nearby cities of Lewiston, Idaho, and Clarkston, Washington, typically refer to "Lewiston Hill" as the mostly unfarmed land north of the city limits of the respective cities, but still remaining visible from the cities.  At the top of the escarpment is a grain farming region known as "the Palouse".

Highways 

  – U.S. Route 95
  – U.S. Route 195
  – SH 128

Old Spiral Highway 

Branching off of State Highway 128 (just east of the Washington-Idaho transition from Washington State Route 128), the "Old Spiral Highway" and former  segment of U.S. Route 95 climbs  of the riverbank north of the confluence of the Snake and Clearwater rivers. It was the primary route north for sixty years, and received an award as one of the best-engineered stretches of mountain highway at the time. It was decommissioned in 1977, when the current alignment of U.S. Route 95 was opened.

The 1950s rock and roll hit by singer-songwriter Charlie Ryan titled "Hot Rod Lincoln" tells of an actual race on that hill. The lyrics of the song were changed variously to say San Pedro or The Grapevine in later versions, but the Ryan claimed at later performances that he was inspired by Lewiston Hill.

In 1990, the fifth stage of the Ore-Ida Women's Challenge cycling race went through Lewiston and ended with a climb up the Old Spiral Highway.

The north end of the Old Spiral Highway joins with U.S. Routes 95 and 195 on the Washington-Idaho border.

U.S. Route 95 up Lewiston Hill 
The newer multi-lane grade of U.S. Route 95 ascending the slope to the north of Lewiston is often simply referred to as "Lewiston Hill" by local residents.

Scenery 

Both grades provide excellent views of the Lewiston-Clarkston area and beyond.

References 

U.S. Highways in Idaho
U.S. Route 95
Transportation in Nez Perce County, Idaho